The men's standing triple jump was a track and field athletics event held as part of the Athletics at the 1904 Summer Olympics programme. It was the second time the event was held. It was held on September 3, 1904. Four athletes, all from the United States, competed. Ray Ewry continued his dominance of the standing jumps at the Olympics, successfully defending his championships in this one as well as the other two. Charles King took silver, with Joseph Stadler earning bronze. With only Americans competing, the second consecutive sweep was assured; with the event no longer held after these Games, no non-American athlete ever won a medal in the standing triple jump.

Background

This was the second and final appearance of the event, which was held twice in 1900 and 1904 (in contrast to the other standing jumps, which continued to be held in 1908 and 1912). American Ray Ewry, the defending champion, was a heavy favorite.

Competition format

There was a single round of jumping. The rules for the jump are not known; the event was called the "hop, step, and jump" at the time but it appears that jumpers could use three standing long jumps rather than a continuous movement.

Records

These were the standing world and Olympic records (in metres) prior to the 1904 Summer Olympics.

No new world or Olympic records were set during the competition.

Schedule

Results

Sources

 

Athletics at the 1904 Summer Olympics
Triple jump at the Olympics